Stephen Lee Cooke (born 15 February 1983) is a former professional footballer who is now retired. Once considered a bright prospect for the future of English football, Cooke's career was seriously affected by a number of injuries.

Playing career

Aston Villa
Cooke was born in Walsall and began his career as a trainee at the FA National School of Excellence in Lilleshall and then signed as a trainee at Manchester United. He moved on to hometown club Walsall before joining Aston Villa. Cooke turned professional in July 2000. He made his first team debut on 2 August 2000, coming on as a second-half substitute for Julian Joachim in Villa's 2–1 defeat at home to Celta Vigo in the UEFA Intertoto Cup semi-final second-leg.

He moved to AFC Bournemouth on loan in March 2002, making his Football League debut in Bournemouth's 5–1 win at home to Northampton Town on 9 March. He returned to Villa before the end of the season.

On 1 January 2003 he finally made his Premier League debut for Aston Villa, coming as a late substitute for Ulises De la Cruz in Villa's 2–0 home win over Bolton Wanderers. He made two further appearances that season for Aston Villa, as a late substitute for Dion Dublin in the 1–0 defeat at home to Manchester United in March and as a second-half substitute for Stefan Moore in the 3–1 defeat away to Leeds United on the final day of the season.

He rejoined Bournemouth again on loan in January 2004 and signed on loan for Wycombe Wanderers in December of the same year. Cooke's Aston Villa career came to an end when he was released at the end of the 2004–05 season.

AFC Bournemouth
In July 2005, Cooke re-signed for Bournemouth, this time on a permanent basis.

Torquay United
On 16 January 2007, he joined Torquay United on loan until the end of the season. Cooke made the good start to his Torquay United career scoring on his debut, but the club lost 5–2 away to Notts County on 19 January. He returned to Bournemouth and was released at the end of the season.

Halesowen Town
On 3 August 2007, Halesowen Town confirmed that Cooke had joined the club along with two other former League players, in the shape of Terry Fleming and Duane Darby.

In September 2007 he undertook a trial with Grimsby Town and later trialled with Wrexham

Both trials came to nothing and he resigned for Halesowen Town.

Weymouth
In April 2009, he signed for Weymouth until the end of the season, but only made four appearances.

Return to Halesowen
For 2009–10, Cooke returned to Halesowen Town where he joined up with former Aston Villa teammate Stefan Moore. However, the second spell was also unsuccessful for Cooke who was released on 17 September 2009 after the club entered administration.

Bloxwich United
Cooke signed for Bloxwich United in September 2009, following his release from Halesowen.

Pelsall Villa
Cooke's stay at Bloxwich United was not a long one, and he soon left to join Pelsall Villa. He played three games in the 2009–10 season, providing one assist.

References

External links

Halesowen Town FC Profile

1982 births
Living people
Sportspeople from Walsall
English footballers
Association football midfielders
Aston Villa F.C. players
Wycombe Wanderers F.C. players
AFC Bournemouth players
Torquay United F.C. players
Halesowen Town F.C. players
Weymouth F.C. players
Pelsall Villa F.C. players
Premier League players
English Football League players
National League (English football) players